Mila is a province (wilayah) of Algeria, whose capital is Mila. Other localities include Teleghma, Grarem Gouga, Hamala and Rouached.

History
The province was created from parts of Constantine Province, Jijel Province, Oum el Bouaghi Province and Sétif Province in 1984.

Administrative divisions
The province is divided into 13 districts (daïras), which are further divided into 32 communes or municipalities.

Districts

 Aïn Beida Harriche
 Bouhatem
 Chelghoum Laïd
 Ferdjioua
 Grarem Gouga
 Mila
 Oued Endja
 Rouached
 Sidi Merouane
 Tadjenanet
 Tassadane Haddada
 Teleghma
 Terrai Bainen

Communes

 Ahmed Rachedi
 Aïn Beida Harriche
 Aïn Mellouk
 Aïn Tine
 Amira Arras
 Benyahia Abderrahmane
 Bouhatem
 Chelghoum Laïd
 Chigara
 Derradji Bousselah
 El Mechira
 Elayadi Barbes
 Ferdjioua
 Grarem Gouga
 Hamala
 Mila
 Minar Zarza
 Oued Athmania
 Oued Endja
 Oued Seguen
 Ouled Khalouf
 Rouached
 Sidi Khelifa
 Sidi Merouane
 Tadjenanet
 Tassadane Haddada
 Teleghma
 Terrai Bainen
 Tessala Ldematai
 Tiberguent
 Yahia Beniguecha
 Zeghaia

References

 
Provinces of Algeria
States and territories established in 1984